Claude-André Lachance (born April 5, 1954) is a former Canadian politician. At the time of his election, aged 20, Lachance was the youngest person ever to be elected to the House of Commons of Canada, and held this record until the election of 19-year-old Pierre-Luc Dusseault in 2011.

Born in Montreal, Quebec, he was first elected as a Liberal candidate in the 1974 federal election in the Montreal riding of Rosemont. He was re-elected in the 1979 and 1980 elections. He was appointed Parliamentary Secretary to the Minister of Justice and Attorney General of Canada (1979) and Minister of State (Trade) (1980–1981).

He earned a Civil Law degree from McGill University, followed by a master's degree in Public Law from University of Ottawa. He was admitted to the Québec Bar in 1977.

He is currently Government Affairs Director for Dow Canada.

Electoral record

References

External links
 

1954 births
Living people
Liberal Party of Canada MPs
McGill University Faculty of Law alumni
Members of the House of Commons of Canada from Quebec
Politicians from Montreal
University of Ottawa alumni
Dow Chemical Company employees